Restless is the ninth studio album by American country music duo The Bellamy Brothers. It was released in 1984 via MCA and Curb Records.

Track listing

Personnel
Adapted from liner notes.

Bellamy Brothers Band
David & Howard Bellamy - lead and harmony vocals, acoustic guitar
Billy Crain - lead & rhythm electric guitars, acoustic guitar
Wally Dentz - bass guitar, harmonica
Dannie Jones - pedal steel guitar, lap steel guitar
Jon LaFrandre - keyboards on "Tragedy"
Juan Perez - drums, percussion

Guest Musicians
George Bitzer - keyboards, synthesizer, string & horn arrangements
George Terry, Joey Murcia - guitars
Ed Calle - saxophone
Joe Galdo - drums, programming
Steve Klein - string & horn arrangements
Kim Wertz - French girl on "World's Greatest Lover"
Kitty Woodson - background vocals on "We're Having Some Fun Now
Chuck Kirkpatrick & John Sambatero - background vocals on "Down to You" & "I Need More of You"

Chart performance

References

1984 albums
The Bellamy Brothers albums
MCA Records albums
Curb Records albums